The Young Warriors is a 2006 Chinese television series based on a series of novels and plays that detail the exploits of the Generals of the Yang Clan during the early Song Dynasty. The series was jointly produced by Chinese Entertainment Shanghai and Huayi Brothers Media Corporation, and stars an ensemble cast of talents from China, Hong Kong, Taiwan, the United States and Canada.

Synopsis
In the 980s, former Later Han general Yang Ye pledges allegiance to Emperor Taizong of the Song dynasty. Yang leads his family and followers to defend Song from invaders of the Khitan Liao Dynasty. Having served Song for years, the Yangs are viewed as an honorable, courageous, and patriotic clan that protects the nation from foreign invasion.

Unfortunately, at the Battle of Golden Beach, the Yangs fall into a conspiracy trap, which concludes with the death of Yang Ye and four of his sons, and another son becoming a prisoner-of-war. Yang's last two surviving sons, Yang Yanzhao and Yang Yande, must continue their family's legacy to bring peace and prosperity to Song, in addition to seeking vengeance on the conspirators.

Cast
 Hu Ge as Yang Yanzhao, Yang Ye's sixth son.
Leo Wu as young Yang Yanzhao
 Lin Chia-yu as Chai Meirong, daughter of Emperor Shizong of the Later Zhou. She is Yang Yanzhao's love interest.
 Peter Ho as Yang Yanhui, Yang Ye's long-lost fourth son. He roams the jianghu together with his teacher as a chivalrous warrior after incidentally separated from his family since childhood under the alias "Chou Muyi" before reuniting with his family.
 Li Hangye as young Yang Yanhui
 Cecilia Liu as Lady Luo, the Yang clan's physician and Yang Yanhui's love interest.
 Chen Long as Yang Yande, Yang Ye's fifth son and second-in-command of the Yang clan army.
 Wei Xiaojun as Guan Hong, a blacksmith and Yang Yande's love interest.
 Eddie Peng as Yang Yansi, Yang Ye's seventh son.
 Liu Xiaojie as Xiaolin, Yang Yansi's first love interest and a Liao spy. She is implied to be a long-lost sister of Du Jin'e due to the similarity in their appearances. Liu Xiaojie simultaneously played Du Jin'e, the daughter of a Tiger Camp bandit leader. She becomes Yang Yansi's second love interest.
 Weng Chia-ming as Yang Ye, the patriarch of the Yang clan and commander of the Yang clan army. He is also known as "Peerless Yang".
 Amy Chan as She Saihua, Yang Ye's wife and mother of the Yang children. She was previously the second-in-command of the Yang clan army.
 Zhao Zicun as Yang Yanqi, Yang Ye's eighth child and only daughter.
 Ethan Li as Yang Yanping, Yang Ye's eldest son.
 Chen Jie as Zhang Jinding, Yang Yanping's wife.
 Song Yang as Yang Yanding, Yang Ye's second son.
 Chen Lili as Yun Cuiying, Yang Yanding's wife.
 Wang Xiaoming as Yang Yan'an, Yang Ye's third son.
 Li Yinning as Luo Sumei, Yang Yan'an's wife.
 Tong Yao as Pan Ying, Pan Renmei's daughter and Chai Meirong's love rival.
 Deng Limin as Pan Renmei, the Song chancellor and a political rival of Yang Ye and the Eighth Virtuous Prince.
 He Jianze as Pan Bao, Pan Renmei's son and Yang Yanhui's love rival.
 Li Jie as Emperor Taizong, the ruler of the Song Dynasty.
 Zong Fengyan as the Eighth Virtuous Prince, Emperor Taizong's nephew and an ally of the Yang clan.
 Wen Haibei as Emperor Taizu, the late founder of the Song Dynasty.
 Zhou Haodong as Cui Yinglong, a chivalrous martial artist and shaman. He was She Saihua's senior and former love interest prior to his separation from She. Cui befriends Yang Ye and serves as a mentor to the Yang children, especially to Yang Yanhui and Yang Yansi.
 Zhang Bojun as Kou Zhun, the Song minister of justice and a political ally of the Yang clan.
 Justin Yuan as Yelü Xie, the Liao army's commander and Yang Yande's love rival.
 Ba Yin as Tianling, a Liao military advisor and shaman. He is Cui Yinglong's former fellow and enemy.
 Guo Qiming as Xiahou Zhan, Tianling's apprentice. He inherits his master's knowledge of toxicology and biological warfare.
 Wang Lei as Madam Hua, a Liao spy who runs a brothel in Northern Song's capital Kaifeng.
 Wu Jiani as Yelü Qiong'e (Princess Yinjing), Lady Luo's love rival.
 Zhang Ruijia as Empress Dowager Xiao, the Liao empress dowager.
 Yang Guang as Mr Zhuge, an advisor of the Tiger Camp.

Production

The series' war segments were later reused in The Legend of the Condor Heroes (2008) for the flashback scene depicting Yang Zaixing's death. The filmmakers obscured the actors' features to differentiate the two television series, but the images' compositions are the same.

The series' costume design is one of its main focal points. During its premiere, the production team hosted runway events for cast members to showcase their costumes. The Yang generals and Yelü Xie's costumes were designed based on battle armour from the Tang, Song and Liao dynasties. However, the Yangs' armours attracted the most attention, as audiences felt that they resembled samurai armour more than Chinese armour, because of their bright red and black colouring, and long narrow plates. The Song military uniform designs were featured again in The Legend of the Condor Heroes (2008) and A Weaver on the Horizon (2010).

Soundtrack

Track listing

References

External links
  The Young Warriors page on CTV website
  The Young Warriors on Sina.com
  The Young Warriors official Chinese Entertainment Shanghai website

Chinese wuxia television series
2006 Chinese television series debuts
2006 Taiwanese television series debuts
Television series set in the Northern Song
Serial drama television series
Works based on The Generals of the Yang Family
Television series by Tangren Media
Asian wars in television
Television series set in the Liao dynasty
Television shows set in Kaifeng
Mandarin-language television shows
China Central Television original programming
Television series by Huayi Brothers